Siamang putih is the name of an Indonesian folk legend.  In this legend, a princess promises that she will wait for her fiancé. After years of waiting for his return, she breaks her promise and is cursed to live out her live as a white siamang (an Indonesian ape). This folktale is also known from the Malay Peninsula, where siamangs occur as well.

References 

Indonesian folklore